Lower Lake (formerly Grantville) is a census-designated place (CDP) in the southern Clear Lake region of Lake County, in northern California.  Lower Lake is also an Indian rancheria of the Koi Nation people.

Geography
Lower Lake was at one point the county seat; the Lake County elections of 1867 were hotly contested, with the seat moving between what is now the city of Lakeport and the town of Lower Lake. In 1870, the feud was settled and Lakeport controlled the seat. Although some believe the seat was stolen from Lower Lake, it has remained in Lakeport for over a century and is no longer a topic of concern for locals.   

History
Lower Lake was founded by E. Mitchell in 1858 as Grantville. He built the first house there. The settlement's first post office was opened in 1858.

The population was 1,294 at the 2010 census, down from 1,755 at the 2000 census.

The Clayton Fire started on August 12, 2016 in areas of Lake County not burned in the Valley and Rocky Point Jerusalem Fires which ravaged Lake County in the summer of 2015. On Sunday afternoon, August 14, 2016, all residents of the town were evacuated and fire razed large parts of the downtown and other areas of Lower Lake, including Copsey Creek Way. Many residents lost everything they had.

Lower Lake Stone Jail
The historic Lower Lake Stone Jail was built in 1876 in Lower Lake, from locally quarried stone. It is reputedly the smallest jail in the United States.

Demographics

2010
At the 2010 census Lower Lake had a population of 1,294. The racial makeup of Lower Lake was 1,031 (79.7%) White, 20 (1.5%) African American, 18 (1.4%) Native American, 13 (1.0%) Asian, 1 (0.1%) Pacific Islander, 125 (9.7%) from other races, and 86 (6.6%) from two or more races. Hispanic or Latino of any race were 219 people (16.9%).

The census reported that 1,291 people (99.8% of the population) lived in households, 3 (0.2%) lived in non-institutionalized group quarters, and no one was institutionalized.

There were 552 households, 146 (26.4%) had children under the age of 18 living in them, 216 (39.1%) were opposite-sex married couples living together, 74 (13.4%) had a female householder with no husband present, 32 (5.8%) had a male householder with no wife present.  There were 40 (7.2%) unmarried opposite-sex partnerships, and 2 (0.4%) same-sex married couples or partnerships. 190 households (34.4%) were one person and 73 (13.2%) had someone living alone who was 65 or older. The average household size was 2.34.  There were 322 families (58.3% of households); the average family size was 2.99.

The age distribution was 259 people (20.0%) under the age of 18, 96 people (7.4%) aged 18 to 24, 254 people (19.6%) aged 25 to 44, 449 people (34.7%) aged 45 to 64, and 236 people (18.2%) who were 65 or older.  The median age was 46.5 years. For every 100 females, there were 99.7 males.  For every 100 females age 18 and over, there were 100.2 males.

There were 705 housing units at an average density of 261.9 per square mile, of the occupied units 389 (70.5%) were owner-occupied and 163 (29.5%) were rented. The homeowner vacancy rate was 6.2%; the rental vacancy rate was 13.7%.  938 people (72.5% of the population) lived in owner-occupied housing units and 353 people (27.3%) lived in rental housing units.

2000
At the 2000 census there were 1,755 people, 716 households, and 458 families in the CDP. The racial makeup of the CDP was 84.44% White, 1.71% African American, 2.05% Native American, 0.63% Asian, 0.40% Pacific Islander, 5.58% from other races, and 5.19% from two or more races. Hispanic or Latino of any race were 11.05%.

Of the 716 households 25.0% had children under the age of 18 living with them, 48.5% were married couples living together, 10.8% had a female householder with no husband present, and 35.9% were non-families. 27.5% of households were one person and 12.2% were one person aged 65 or older.  The average household size was 2.45 and the average family size was 2.97.

The age distribution was 23.2% under the age of 18, 7.9% from 18 to 24, 22.3% from 25 to 44, 27.2% from 45 to 64, and 19.4% 65 or older.  The median age was 43 years. For every 100 females, there were 100.3 males.  For every 100 females age 18 and over, there were 94.0 males.

The median household income was $24,974 and the median family income  was $29,896. Males had a median income of $38,750 versus $21,250 for females. The per capita income for the CDP was $13,516.  About 9.9% of families and 12.4% of the population were below the poverty line, including 12.0% of those under age 18 and 5.4% of those age 65 or over.

Government

References

External links
  California.hometownlocator.com:  Lower Lake community profile

 
Census-designated places in Lake County, California
Populated places established in 1858
1858 establishments in California
Census-designated places in California